Robert Joseph Hyland (born July 21, 1945 in White Plains, New York) is a former American football guard who played eleven seasons in the National Football League (NFL) for the Green Bay Packers, Chicago Bears, New York Giants, and the New England Patriots.  He played college football at Boston College and was drafted in the first round (ninth overall) of the 1967 NFL Draft. He played high school football at Archbishop Stepinac (Class of 1963).

Hyland owned the now-defunct Sports Page pub and Sports Page in White Plains, New York.

In March 2011, Hyland ran as the Republican candidate for mayor of White Plains, New York, in the wake of mayor Adam Bradley's resignation. He was defeated by Thomas Roach.

References

1945 births
Living people
American football offensive linemen
Boston College Eagles football players
Green Bay Packers players
New York Giants players
Chicago Bears players
New England Patriots players
Archbishop Stepinac High School alumni